"Chain Reaction" is a song by Australian pop rock singer John Farnham. It was released in August 1990 as the lead single from his 14th studio album of the same title. The song peaked at number six on the Australian Singles Chart and was certified gold by the Australian Recording Industry Association (ARIA). At the 1991 Logie Awards, the music video won Most Popular Music Video.

Track listing
Australian CD and 7-inch single
 "Chain Reaction" – 3:12	
 "In Your Hands" – 4:19

12-inch single
 "Chain Reaction" (Tex mix) – 6:07
 "In Days to Come" – 4:01
 "Chain Reaction" (radio mix) – 3:12

Charts

Weekly charts

Year-end charts

Certifications

References

1990 singles
1990 songs
John Farnham songs
RCA Records singles
Songs written by David A. Stewart
Songs written by Siobhan Fahey